The Nandi Award for Best Special Effects instituted since 2005 is given after the Nandi Awards committee selects a film from all the films that released in that particular year, which has the best visual effects.

The award is usually given to the special effects supervisor or the special effects company that worked for the selected film. Magadheera, Eega, and Baahubali: The Beginning are the films which won both the Nandi Award for Best Special Effects and National Film Award for Best Special Effects for that year.

See also
 Nandi Awards

References

Nandi Awards